Morris "Maurice, Moe" Roberts (December 13, 1905 – February 7, 1975) was an American ice hockey goaltender with the Boston Bruins, New York Americans, and Chicago Black Hawks for periods between 1925 and 1951, spending the rest of his career in different minor leagues. Roberts was the oldest man to play the position of goaltender in National Hockey League history, and in two different stretches of several decades was both the oldest player to play a NHL game and the youngest to play goal in the NHL. Roberts was born in Waterbury, Connecticut, but grew up in Somerville, Massachusetts.

History
Roberts played a total of ten games in the NHL with the Boston Bruins, New York Americans, and Chicago Black Hawks, as well as playing sixteen seasons in the minor leagues, most notably for the Cleveland Barons and the New Haven Eagles.  His career was interrupted for four seasons after he enlisted in the United States Navy during World War II. After the war, he played only one more regular season of professional hockey.

Roberts made his NHL debut with the Boston Bruins on December 8, 1925, substituting for injured regular Doc Stewart in a 3-2 win against the Montreal Maroons. At age 19, he was the youngest goaltender in NHL history, until surpassed by Harry Lumley nearly twenty years later.

On November 25, 1951, Roberts, then an assistant trainer with the Black Hawks, had to finish the third period for the injured Lumley, at that point the Black Hawks' starter. Although Roberts didn't yield a goal, his Hawks still fell to the Detroit Red Wings, 5-2. The then 45-year-old Roberts, in his last NHL game, became the oldest player to play in an NHL game; a record he held until broken by Gordie Howe in 1979, and also passed by Chris Chelios. He remains the oldest goaltender to play in an NHL game.  He also was the final NHL player who was active in the 1920s.

Roberts was inducted into the United States Hockey Hall of Fame in 2005.

Career statistics

Regular season and playoffs

See also
 List of oldest National Hockey League players

References

External links

1905 births
1975 deaths
American men's ice hockey goaltenders
Boston Athletic Association ice hockey players
Boston Bruins players
Chicago Blackhawks players
Cleveland Barons (1937–1973) players
Cleveland Falcons players
Cleveland Indians (IHL) players
Ice hockey players from Massachusetts
Jewish ice hockey players
New Haven Eagles players
New York Americans players
Philadelphia Arrows players
Pittsburgh Hornets players
Rochester Cardinals players
Sportspeople from Somerville, Massachusetts
Syracuse Stars (IHL) players
United States Hockey Hall of Fame inductees